Skeldon is a small town in eastern coastal Guyana, on the estuary of the Corentyne River, which forms Guyana's border with Suriname. As of 2012 it had an population of 2,275 . Skeldon and Springlands have been administratively merged into Corriverton.

Economy
Sugar production forms the backbone to the local economy. The Guyana Sugar Corporation, Guyana's main sugar processing company, has a factory and works at Skeldon.

Transport
The town is served by several buses that connect the town to Georgetown and other villages. At Moleson Creek, the Stelling with ferry services to Suriname is located. There is an airstrip for small aircraft within GuySuco's Skeldon Sugar Estate's premises.

Notable people
Imran Jafferally (1980), cricketer
Carlston Harris (1987), mixed martial artist

References

Populated places in East Berbice-Corentyne